In From the Cold is an American spy thriller streaming television series created by Adam Glass. The series follows a divorced mother and ex-Russian spy, living secretly in the United States, as she is forced back into her old life after the CIA learns about her real identity. It was released as a Netflix original on January 28, 2022.

In its first 16 days on Netflix, the show was watched for 85.83 million hours globally.

Cast and characters

Main 

 Margarita Levieva as Jenny Franklin/Anya Petrova/The Whisper, a former Russian spy and assassin living a double-life as a citizen of the United States.  She has the ability to shape-shift
 Stasya Miloslavskaya as young Anya Petrova
 Cillian O'Sullivan as Chauncey Lew
 Lydia Fleming as Becca Franklin, Jenny's daughter
 Charles Brice as "Chris" Clarke
 Alyona Khmelnitskaya as Svetlana Petrova

Recurring

 Anastasia Martin as Faina Orlov, a young Russian woman who falls in love with Anya unaware that she is an assassin whose target is Faina's father.
 José Luis García Pérez as Felipe Calero
 Alexandra Prokhorova as Gala Morazava a deadly assassin associate with Felipe Calero.

Episodes

References

External links 

2022 American television series debuts 
2020s American drama television series
2020s American LGBT-related drama television series
2020s American LGBT-related television series
2020s American science fiction television series
American spy thriller television series
Bisexuality-related television series
Espionage television series
Lesbian-related television shows
Television shows set in Madrid
English-language Netflix original programming